Recreation.gov is a website run by 12 different US Federal and State Government organizations, including:

 Bureau of Land Management
 Bureau of Reclamation
 Bureau of Engraving and Printing
 Federal Highway Administration
 National Archives & Records Administration
 National Oceanic & Atmospheric Administration
 National Park Service
 Smithsonian Institution
 Tennessee Valley Authority
 Fish and Wildlife Service
 US Army Corps of Engineers 
 US Forest Service

The website allows for booking camping and RV sites across the United States. The site has listings for 4,200 facilities and activities and over 113,000 individual reservable sites across the United States according to the website in 2021.

References 

Publications of the United States government